Nicholas Rabiu (born 17 February 2004) is an Ecuadorian footballer player who plays as a winger for New York Red Bulls II in the USL Championship.

Career
Rabiu has played with the New York Red Bulls academy since 2019, after joining from New York SC.

In 2021, Rabiu appeared for New York Red Bulls II in the USL Championship, making his first appearance on 23 July, as an 88th-minute substitute during a 3–1 loss to Pittsburgh Riverhounds.

International career
On 26 July 2021, Rabiu was called up to the Ecuador under-17 national team squad.

References

External links 
 

2004 births
Living people
Ecuadorian footballers
New York Red Bulls II players
Association football forwards
Soccer players from New York (state)
USL Championship players